Dagestanskoye is a rural locality (a selo) in Kardonovsky Selsoviet, Kizlyarsky District, Republic of Dagestan, Russia. The population was 354 as of 2010.

Geography 
It is located 4 km southeast of Kardonovka.

Nationalities 
Avars live there.

References 

Rural localities in Kizlyarsky District